Joe Hollis (born July 13, 1947) is a former American football and baseball coach.  He served as the head football coach at  Jacksonville State University in 1984 and at Arkansas State University from 1997 to 2001, compiling a career college football record of 17–48–1.  Hollis was also the head baseball coach at Troy State University, now Troy University, from 1973 to 1974 and again from 1976 to 1978, tallying a mark of 106–75.

Head coaching record

College football

References

1947 births
Living people
Auburn Tigers baseball players
Auburn Tigers football players
Arkansas State Red Wolves athletic directors
Arkansas State Red Wolves football coaches
Georgia Bulldogs football coaches
Jacksonville State Gamecocks football coaches
Ohio State Buckeyes football coaches
Troy Trojans baseball coaches
Troy Trojans football coaches
Tulsa Golden Hurricane football coaches
High school football coaches in Alabama
Sportspeople from Florence, Alabama